In astrophysics and particle physics, self-interacting dark matter (SIDM) is an alternative class of dark matter particles which have strong interactions, in contrast to the standard cold dark matter model (CDM).  SIDM was postulated in 2000 as a solution to the core-cusp problem. In the simplest models of DM self-interactions, a Yukawa-type potential and a force carrier φ mediates between two dark matter particles. On galactic scales, DM self-interaction leads to energy and momentum exchange between DM particles. Over cosmological time scales this results in isothermal cores in the central region of dark matter haloes.

If the self-interacting dark matter is in hydrostatic equilibrium, its pressure and density follow:

The equation naturally correlates the dark matter distribution to that of the baryonic matter distribution. With this correlation, the self-interacting dark matter can explain phenomena such as the Tully–Fisher relation.

Self-interacting dark matter has also been postulated as an explanation for the DAMA annual modulation signal. Moreover, it is shown that it can serve the seed of supermassive black holes at high redshift.

See also
MACS J0025.4-1222, astronomical observations that constrain DM self-interaction
ESO 146-5, the core of Abell 3827 that was claimed as the first evidence of SIDM
Strongly interacting massive particle (SIMP), proposed to explain cosmic ray data
Lambda-CDM model

References

Further reading

 

Astroparticle physics
Dark matter